Neil K. Garg is currently a Distinguished professor of chemistry and holds the Kenneth N. Trueblood Endowed Chair at the University of California, Los Angeles. Garg's research is focused on the chemical synthesis of organic compounds, with an emphasis on the development of new strategies for the preparation of complex molecules possessing unique structural, biological, and physical properties. His group has made breakthroughs in catalysis, especially strong bond activation of esters and amides using nickel catalysts, and in the understanding and utilization of strained intermediates, such as arynes, cyclic alkynes, and cyclic allenes.  His laboratory has completed the total syntheses of many natural products, including welwitindolinones, akuammilines, and tubingensin alkaloids. Garg is a co-Founder of ElectraTect, Inc.,

He has inspired a series of student-created music videos to encourage students to learn organic chemistry. He has led other innovative projects, such as the Organic Coloring Book series, The O-Chem (Re)-Activity Book, the Backside Attack smartphone app, QR Chem, RS Chemistry, Virtual Reality Chemistry, ChemMatch, Biology And Chemistry Online Notes (BACON). and #MentorFirst. These resources have benefited hundreds of thousands of people in more than 150 countries worldwide.

Education
Garg received his B.S. from New York University in 2000.  He went on to earn his Ph.D. at the California Institute of Technology, where he studied organic chemistry under the supervision of Brian Stoltz as a DoD NDSEG Fellow, completing his studies in 2005. Upon completion of his graduate work, he held an NIH post-doctoral appointment in the laboratory of Larry Overman at University of California - Irvine from 2005 to 2007.

Awards and honors
 Mukaiyama Award, 2022
 Fellow of the American Institute of Chemists, 2022
 Royal Society of Chemistry’s Horizon Prize (Garg Molecular Educators Team), 2021
 Royal Society of Chemistry’s Horizon Prize (Tang/Houk/Garg Pericyclase Team), 2021
 ACS Edward Leete Award, 2019
 James Flack Norris Award for Outstanding Achievement in the Teaching of Chemistry, 2019 
 US Defense Science Study Group (DSSG 2022-2023), 2019
 New York University’s Distinguished Alumnus Award, 2019 
 ASBMB Award for Exemplary Contributions to Education, 2019
 Fellow of the American Chemical Society, 2018
 Robert Foster Cherry Award for Great Teaching, 2018
 Robert Foster Cherry Award for Great Teaching, Finalist, 2017
 Royal Society of Chemistry's Higher Education Award, 2017
 American Chemical Society Elias J. Corey Award for Outstanding Original Contribution in Organic Synthesis, 2017
 Mitsui Chemicals Catalysis Science Award of Encouragement, 2016
 Royal Society of Chemistry’s Merck Award, 2016
 Guggenheim Fellowship, 2016
 Thieme-IUPAC Prize, 2016
 Tetrahedron Young Investigator Award, 2016
 California’s US Professor of the Year, Carnegie Foundation for the Advancement of Teaching, 2015
 UCLA Gold Shield Faculty Prize, 2015
 American Chemical Society Arthur C. Cope Scholar Award, 2015
 UCLA Distinguished Award for Teaching and Eby Award for the Art of Teaching, 2014
 Camille Dreyfus Teacher-Scholar Award, 2013
 A. P. Sloan Research Fellowship, 2012
 UCLA Hanson–Dow Award for Excellence in Teaching, 2011
 NSF CAREER Award, 2010

Current
Garg was promoted to Distinguished Professor at UCLA in 2020. In 2018, he became the inaugural holder of the Kenneth N. Trueblood Endowed Chair in Chemistry & Biochemistry. He has served as Vice Chair for the Department of Chemistry and Biochemistry (2012-2016) and currently serves as the Department Chair (2019–present). He also served as Faculty-in-Residence in the UCLA dormitories from 2012-2021.

References

External links 
 Garg's research group at UCLA

University of California, Los Angeles faculty
California Institute of Technology alumni
1978 births
Living people
21st-century American chemists